Wentworth North and Brant was a federal electoral district represented in the House of Commons of Canada from 1892 to 1904. It was located west of the city of Hamilton in the province of Ontario.

It was created from parts of Wentworth North and Brant North ridings in 1892, and consisted of the townships of Ancaster, Blenheim, East Brantford, South Dumfries and Beverley.

The electoral district was abolished in 1903 when it was redistributed between Brant and Wentworth ridings.

Electoral history

|- 
  
|Liberal
|SOMERVILLE, Jas.  
|align="right"|1,824 
  
|Conservative
|MUMA, Chas. C. 
|align="right"| 703  
|}

|- 
  
|Liberal
|PATERSON, Hon. William
|align="right"|2,059 
  
|Conservative
|JONES, S. Alfred  
|align="right"|961   
|}

See also 

 List of Canadian federal electoral districts
 Past Canadian electoral districts

External links 

 Website of the Parliament of Canada

Former federal electoral districts of Ontario